Drenchia is a comune (municipality) in the Province of Udine in the Italian region Friuli-Venezia Giulia, located about  north of Trieste and about  northeast of Udine, on the border with Slovenia. Drenchia is located on the western slopes of the Kolovrat Range, dividing Italy from Slovenia, and borders the following municipalities: Grimacco, Kanal ob Soči (Slovenia), Kobarid (Slovenia), and Tolmin (Slovenia).

Drenchia localities include Clabuzzaro/Brieg, Crai/Kraj, Cras/Kras, Drenchia inferiore/Dolenja Dreka, Drenchia Superiore/Gorenja Dreka, Lase/Laze, Malinsche/Malinske, Obenetto/Dubenije, Obranche/Obranke, Oznebrida/Ocnebardo, Paciuch/Pačuh, Peternel/Peternel, Prapotnizza/Praponca, San Volfango/Svet Štuoblank, Trinco/Trinko, Trusgne/Trušnje, Zavart/Zavart, Zuodar/Cuoder.

Municipal hall is located in Cras.

Ethnic composition

97% of the population in Drenchia were Slovenes according to the census 1971.

Demographic decline

References

Gallery

See also
Venetian Slovenia
Friuli
Slovene Lands

Cities and towns in Friuli-Venezia Giulia